Matthias Klostermayr, also known as Bavarian Hiasl (German Bayerischer Hiasl, Austro-Bavarian Boarische Hiasl) (3 September 1736—6 September 1771), was a German outlaw, poacher and social rebel who has come to be described, particularly in accounts written in the English-speaking world, as the Bavarian Robin Hood. A native of the municipality of Kissing near Augsburg (his name on the baptismal register is Mattheus Klostermair—the Austro-Bavarian spelling of it), Bavarian Hiasl became an outlaw, first as a poacher and ultimately as the Robin Hood-like leader of a gang of robbers who, during the 1760s, plundered, sacked and robbed in the region around Munich, Augsburg and Swabia. Although he was captured and put to death by being broken on the wheel in 1771, his mythical accumulated treasure has never been found, and legends surrounding its purported whereabouts have placed it somewhere near one of his hideouts, in an old cave in Kuchelschlag Wood or on Jexhof Farm.

In Bavaria and elsewhere, he has become a folk hero, with books, songs, musicals and a modern multimedia museum in Kissing ("Hiasl Erlebniswelt", or "the World of Hiasl") dedicated to him. The museum recreates for visitors the life and times of the "German prince of forests", the "Bavarian Robin Hood", whose gruesome execution took place in Dillingen an der Donau. Friedrich Schiller is presumed to have based Karl Moor, the tragic protagonist of his first play, The Robbers, on the Bavarian Hiasl ten years later, in 1781.

References

Hansen, Walter (1978). Das war der Bayerische Hiasl: Deutschlands berühmtester Wildschütz und Räuberhauptmann. Pfaffenhofen
Schelle, Hans (1991). Der Bayerische Hiasl. Lebensbild eines Volkshelden. Rosenheim. 
Drexler, Toni, et al. (2002). Im Wald da sind die Räuber: Kneißl, Hiasl & Co. Räuberromantik und Realität. Schöngeising.

External links
Official website of the World of Hiasl museum

German folklore
Criminals from Bavaria
German outlaws
People executed by breaking wheel
People from the Duchy of Bavaria
People from the Principality of Ansbach
1736 births
1772 deaths
People from Aichach-Friedberg
Executed people from Bavaria
18th-century executions in the Holy Roman Empire
People executed by Germany